These are the results for the 2005 edition of the Gent–Wevelgem cycling classic, won in controversial circumstances by Nico Mattan. After the race, Fassa Bortolo team director Giancarlo Ferreti lodged an appeal with the race jury, claiming that Mattan had used the slipstream of press and support vehicles to beat Fassa rider Juan Antonio Flecha. UCI officials blamed the vehicles rather than Mattan and upheld the race result.

General standings

06-04-2005: Gent–Wevelgem, 208 km.

References

External links
Race website

Gent–Wevelgem
Gent–Wevelgem
2005 in Belgian sport